Luis Humberto Crosthwaite is a writer, editor and journalist whose work has appeared in a variety of international venues. His fiction has garnered critical attention for his ability to express the complexities of living on the US/Mexico border region.

Life and work
Crosthwaite was born in 1962 in Tijuana, Mexico, where he spent most of his life before moving to San Diego, California, where he worked at The San Diego Union-Tribune newspaper as columnist and editor.

Crosthwaite currently lives in Tijuana, Mexico.

Works in Spanish
 Marcela y el rey al fin juntos (short stories, 1988)
 Mujeres con traje de baño caminan solitarias por las playas de su llanto (short stories, 1990)
 El gran preténder (novella, 1990)
 No quiero escribir no quiero (short stories, 1993)
 Lo que estará en mi corazón (non-fiction, 1994)
 La luna siempre será un amor difícil (novel, 1994)
 Estrella de la calle sexta (two novellas and a short story), 2000)
 Idos de la mente - la increíble y (a veces) triste historia de Ramón y Cornelio (novel, 2001)
 Instrucciones para cruzar la frontera (short stories, 2002)
 Aparta de mí este cáliz (novel, 2009)
 Idos de la mente - la increíble y (a veces) triste historia de Ramón y Cornelio (revised edition, 2010)
 Tijuana: crimen y olvido (novel, 2010)
 Instrucciones para cruzar la frontera (revised edition, 2011)

Works in English
 1997: The moon will forever be a Distant Love (novel), translated by Debbie Nathan from: La luna siempre será un dificíl amor.
 Puro Border: Dispatches, Snapshots, & Graffiti from La Frontera (Co-Editor)

References

1962 births
Mexican novelists
Mexican male writers
Male novelists
Mexican male short story writers
Mexican short story writers
Living people
Mexican emigrants to the United States
University of Iowa faculty
Mexican people of Irish descent